is a Japanese kickboxer, currently competing in the atomweight divisions of K-1 and Krush, where she is the current Krush Atomweight champion and the current K-1 Atomweight champion.

Kickboxing career

Early career
Prior to making her professional debut, Sugawara competed as an amateur, during which time she won the 2017 K-1 All Japan B-Class tournament at 50 kg and the 2018 K-1 All Japan B-Class tournament at 45 kg. This led to her being named the "Amateur Fighter of the Year" at 2018 K-1 awards.

Sugawara made her professional debut against the more experienced, but winless, Satomi Toyoshima at Krush 97 on January 26, 2019. She won the fight by unanimous decision, with two judges scoring the fight 30–26 in her favor, while the third judge awarded her a 29–28 scorecard. Sugawara next faced the 2018 K-1 All Japan Amateur tournament winner Michiko Nobutani, who was making her professional debut, at K-1 KRUSH FIGHT 100 on April 19, 2019. She suffered the first loss and the first stoppage loss of her professional career, as Nobutani won by a third-round knockout.

After suffering her first loss, Sugawara faced the unbeaten Chan Lee at K-1 KRUSH FIGHT 103 on July 21, 2019. She won the fight by majority decision. Two judges scored the fight 30–29 and 30–28 for her, while the third judge scored the bout an even 29–29. Sugawara next faced the one-time Krush Atomweight title challenger Shizuka at K-1 KRUSH FIGHT 109 on December 15, 2019. She won the fight by unanimous decision, with scores of 30–28, 30–27 and 30–28.

Krush Atomweight champion

Krush Atomweight tournament
On June 17, 2020, it was announced that a Krush atomweight tournament would be held to crown a new champion, as the title was left vacant after Miho Takanashi moved up in weight. Sugawara faced Yu Fukuhara in the tournament semifinal, while the other bracket pitted Moe Takahashi against Chan Lee. She won the semifinal bout, which was held at Krush 115 on July 21, 2021, by unanimous decision. Two juges scored the bout 30–28 in her favor, while the third judge scored the fight 30–27 for Sugawara.

Sugawara faced Moe Takahashi in the tournament final, which was scheduled as the co-main event of Krush 119 on November 27, 2020. She won the fight by a narrow unanimous decision. Two of the judges scored the fight 30–29 for Sugawara, while the third judge awarded her a 30–28 scorecard. Sugawara was warned for repeated headbutting in the second round, although no points were deducted.

Title reign
Sugawara made her K-1 debut against the undefeated Nozomi Sigemura at K'Festa 4 Day 1 on March 21, 2021. She won the fight by a dominant unanimous decision, with scores of 30–27, 30–26 and 30–27.

Sugawara faced the four-time Shoot Boxing tournament winner Mio Tsumura at K-1 World GP 2020 in Osaka on May 29, 2021, in her second K-1 appearance. She lost the fight by a close majority decision, with one judge scoring the fight as a 29–29 draw, while the remaining two judges scored it 30–29 for Tsumura. Following the second loss of her professional career, the pair was booked to rematch at Krush 128 on August 21, 2021, with the Krush Atomweight title on the line. Sugawara later withdrew from the bout, due to the COVID-19 protocols, as she came into contact with an infected person. The fight was rescheduled for Krush 131 on November 20, 2021. Sugawara retained her title by unanimous decision, with scores of 30–28, 30–28 and 29–28.

Sugawara made her second title defense against Yu Fukuhara in the co-main event of Krush 134 on February 20, 2022. The bout was a rematch of their July 21, 2020 fight, which Sugawara won by unanimous decision. She won the rematch in the same manner, with scores of 30–29, 30–28 and 30–27.

K-1 Atomweight Grand Prix
On May 12, 2022, it was announced that a K-1 Atomweight Grand Prix would be held, which would crown the inaugural atomweight champion. Sugawara was booked to face the unbeated Kira Matsutani, while the other pairing saw Phayahong Ayothayafightgym face Mio Tsumura. The one-day four-women tournament was held at K-1: Ring of Venus on June 25, 2022, at the Yoyogi National Gymnasium in Tokyo, Japan. She won the fight by majority decision, with two judges scoring the fight 30–29 in her favor, while the third judge scored the bout as a 30–30 draw. Sugawara advanced to the tournament finals, where she faced Phayahong Ayothayafightgym. The fight was ruled a majority decision draw following the first three rounds, with two judges scoring the fight 30–30 and 29–29, while the third judge scored it 30–29 for Phayahong. Accordingly, an extension round was fought, after which Phayahong was awarded a split decision.

Continued title reign
Sugawara made her third Krush Women's Atomweight Championship defense against Chan Lee at Krush 142 on October 28, 2022. The pair previously faced each other at K-1 KRUSH FIGHT 103 on July 21, 2019, with Sugawara winning by majority decision. She won the rematch by a third-round knockout, the first stoppage victory of her professional career. She was later named the October "Fighter of the Month" by eFight.

K-1 Atomweight champion
Sugawara challenged the K-1 Women's Atomweight champion Phayahong Ayothayafightgym at K-1 World GP 2023: K'Festa 6 on March 12, 2023. The title bout was a rematch of their 2021 K-1 Atomweight Grand Prix finals meeting, which Sugawara lost by split decision, after an extension round was contested. She won the fight by majority decision, with scores of 30–28, 30–28 and 29–29.

Championships and accomplishments

Amateur
Shin Karate
2016 Shin Karate All Japan K-3 Grand Prix -50kg Winner
2017 Shin Karate All Japan K-3 Grand Prix -50kg Winner
K-1
2017 K-1 Amateur B-Class Qualifying Tournament Winner (-50 kg)
2017 K-1 Amateur All Japan B-Class Challenge Tournament Winner (-50 kg)
2018 K-1 Amateur B-Class Qualifying Tournament Winner (-45 kg)
2018 K-1 Amateur All Japan B-Class Challenge Tournament Winner (-45 kg)

Professional
Krush
Krush Women's Atomweight Championship
Three successful title defenses
K-1
2022 K-1 Atomweight Grand Prix Runner-up
2023 K-1 Women's Atomweight champion

Awards
K-1
2018 K-1 "Amateur Fighter of the Year"
2021 K-1 "Newcomer of the Year"
2022 Krush "Fighter of the Year"
eFight.com
October 2022 eFight "Fighter of the Month"

Kickboxing record

|- style="background:#cfc;"
| 2023-03-12 || Win ||align=left| Phayahong Ayothayafightgym || K-1 World GP 2023: K'Festa 6 || Tokyo, Japan || Decision (Majority)|| 3 ||3:00 
|-
! style=background:white colspan=9 |
|-
|-  style="background:#cfc"
| 2022-10-28 || Win ||align=left| Chan Lee || Krush 142 || Tokyo, Japan || KO (Right straight) || 3 || 2:29 
|-
! style=background:white colspan=9 |
|-
|-  style="background:#fbb"
| 2022-06-25||Loss||align=left| Phayahong Ayothayafightgym || K-1: Ring of Venus, Tournament Final || Tokyo, Japan || Ext.R Decision (Split)  || 4 || 3:00
|-
! style=background:white colspan=9 |
|-
|-  style="background:#cfc"
| 2022-06-25||Win ||align=left| Kira Matsutani || K-1: Ring of Venus, Tournament Semifinal || Tokyo, Japan || Decision (Majority)  || 3 || 3:00
|-
|-  style="background:#cfc"
| 2022-02-20||Win ||align=left| Yu || Krush 134 || Tokyo, Japan || Decision (Unanimous)  || 3 || 3:00
|-
! style=background:white colspan=9 |
|-
|-  style="background:#cfc"
| 2021-11-20||Win ||align=left| MIO || Krush 131 || Tokyo, Japan || Decision (Unanimous)  || 3 || 3:00
|-
! style=background:white colspan=9 |
|-
|-  style="background:#fbb"
| 2021-05-29|| Loss ||align=left| MIO || K-1 World GP 2021: Yokohamatsuri || Yokohama, Japan || Decision (Unanimous)  || 3 || 3:00
|-
|-  style="background:#cfc"
| 2021-03-21 ||Win ||align=left| Nozomi || K'Festa 4 Day 1 || Tokyo, Japan || Decision (Unanimous)  || 3 || 3:00
|-
|-  style="background:#cfc"
| 2020-11-27 ||Win ||align=left| MOE|| Krush 119, Tournament Finals || Tokyo, Japan || Decision (Unanimous) || 3 || 3:00
|-
! style=background:white colspan=9 |
|-
|-  style="background:#cfc"
| 2020-07-21 ||Win ||align=left| Yu || Krush 115, Tournament Semifinals || Tokyo, Japan || Decision (Unanimous) || 3 || 3:00
|-
|-  style="background:#cfc"
| 2019-12-15 ||Win ||align=left| C-ZUKA || K-1 KRUSH FIGHT 109 || Tokyo, Japan || Decision (Unanimous) || 3 || 3:00
|-
|-  style="background:#cfc"
| 2019-07-21||Win ||align=left| Chan Lee|| K-1 KRUSH FIGHT 103 || Tokyo, Japan || Decision (Majority) || 3 || 3:00
|-
|-  style="background:#fbb"
| 2019-04-19 || Loss ||align=left| Michiko Nobutani || K-1 KRUSH FIGHT 100|| Tokyo, Japan || TKO (Referee stoppage) || 3 || 1:08
|-
|-  style="background:#cfc"
| 2019-01-26 ||Win ||align=left| Satomi Toyoshima || Krush 97 || Tokyo, Japan || Decision (Unanimous) || 3 || 3:00
|-
| colspan=9 | Legend:    

|-
|-  style="background:#CCFFCC;"
| 2018-09-09 || Win ||align=left| Miyu Takano || K-1 Amateur 23 - All Japan Selection, Final|| Tokyo, Japan || Decision (Unanimous) || 1 || 2:00 

|-  style="background:#CCFFCC;"
| 2018-09-09 || Win ||align=left| Ann Fujii|| K-1 Amateur 23 - All Japan Selection, Semifinal|| Tokyo, Japan || Decision (Unanimous) || 1 || 2:00 

|-  style="background:#CCFFCC;"
| 2018-06-10 || Win ||align=left| Miyu Wakabayashi || 6th K-1 Amateur All Japan Tournament, Final || Tokyo, Japan || TKO ||  || 
|-
! style=background:white colspan=9 |
|-
|-  style="background:#CCFFCC;"
| 2018-06-10 || Win ||align=left| Riko Kato || 6th K-1 Amateur All Japan Tournament, Semifinal || Tokyo, Japan || TKO ||  || 
|-
|-  style="background:#CCFFCC;"
| 2018-02-25 || Win ||align=left| Miyu Wakabayashi || K-1 Amateur 20 - All Japan Selection, Final || Tokyo, Japan || Decision || 1 || 2:00 

|-  style="background:#CCFFCC;"
| 2018-02-25 || Win ||align=left| Reika Tsunoda || K-1 Amateur 20 - All Japan Selection, Semifinal || Tokyo, Japan || KO || 1 || 

|-  style="background:#CCFFCC;"
| 2017-12-03 || Win ||align=left| Koko Shimodaira || 5th K-1 Amateur All Japan Tournament, Final || Tokyo, Japan || Decision (Majority)|| 1 || 2:00
|-
! style=background:white colspan=9 |
|-
|-  style="background:#CCFFCC;"
| 2017-12-03 || Win ||align=left| Minori Sasaki || 5th K-1 Amateur All Japan Tournament, Semifinal || Tokyo, Japan || Decision (Unanimous)|| 1 || 2:00

|-  style="background:#CCFFCC;"
| 2017-07-09 || Win ||align=left| Koko Shimodaira || K-1 Amateur 18 - All Japan Selection, Final || Tokyo, Japan || Decision (Split)|| 1 || 2:00

|-  style="background:#CCFFCC;"
| 2017-07-09 || Win ||align=left| Reika Tsunoda || K-1 Amateur 18 - All Japan Selection, Semifinal || Tokyo, Japan || Decision (Unanimous)|| 1 || 2:00

|-  style="background:#CCFFCC;"
| 2017-04-29 || Win ||align=left| Yuria Rin || K-1 Amateur 17 || Tokyo, Japan || KO|| 1 || 
|-
| colspan=9 | Legend:

See also
 List of female kickboxers
 List of Krush champions

References

Japanese kickboxers
1999 births
Living people
People from Itabashi
Sportspeople from Tokyo
Japanese female kickboxers
Kickboxing champions